Blazing star may refer to:

 Blazing Star, a 1998 video game for the Neo Geo system
 Blazing Star, a lesbian group that was part of the Chicago Women's Liberation Union
 Blazing Star, the newsletter produced by the lesbian group that was part of the Chicago Women's Liberation Union
 The Blazing Star, the journal of the North American Native Plant Society

Plants
 Chamaelirium luteum, native to eastern North America
 Liatris, several species
 Several species of Mentzelia, including:
 Mentzelia laevicaulis, giant or smooth-stem blazing star, native to western North America
 Mentzelia lindleyi, native to California
 Mentzelia pumila, golden blazing star, native to northern Mexico and the western United States
 Tritonia crocata, native to southern Africa and a weed elsewhere

See also
 Primula sect. Dodecatheon, a group of wildflowers called shooting star